The Hauser Center for Nonprofit Organizations at Harvard University seeks to expand understanding and accelerate critical thinking about civil society among scholars, practitioners, policy makers and the general public, by encouraging scholarship, developing curriculum, fostering mutual learning between academics and practitioners, and shaping policies that enhance the sector and its role in society. The Hauser Center was established by Rita Hauser and her husband Gustave M. Hauser in 1997.

Located at the Harvard Kennedy School of Government, the Center's concerns include philanthropy, nonprofit organizations, voluntarism, and civil society. The Center provides an intellectual home for faculty, research fellows, visiting scholars, and students across the university who share interests in these topics. 
The Center hosts several regular seminars during the academic year on topics of interest to the nonprofit community as well as those that are part of the Center's research projects. It hosts special events beyond Harvard, such as the NGO Leaders Forum, a semi-annual retreat for chief executives of major U.S.-based international relief and development NGOs. It also brings leaders of nonprofit institutions to Harvard, such as its senior research fellows Jim Bildner, L. David Brown, Steven Lawry, Peter Bell, Jennifer McCrea, and Marion Fremont-Smith.

Programs and projects

The Hauser Center's programs and projects engage scholars and practitioners interested in the nonprofit field on a variety of topics. 
The Course on Exponential Fundraising  is an experiential learning course designed for a select group of nonprofit leaders who want to improve their organization's results and reshape the field of fundraising. The Course reconceptualizes fundraising as something that is not only mission critical, but a vehicle to fundamentally transform organizations and the people who are involved with them. 
The Humanitarian & Development NGOs program seeks to enhance the impact of the field by strengthening interactions between scholars and practitioners including the NGO Leaders’ Forum, the IANGO Workshp, NGO Leaders’ Seminar Series, Research, Blogs and Study Groups. 
The Justice and Human Rights program works with NGOs from the Global South who are responding to grave crimes and injustices in their countries and beyond. Projects connect these vital civil society actors to each other - and to expertise and resources at Harvard and beyond – to strengthen these NGOs’ ability to address real-time and emerging opportunities and challenges in the field. 
The Initiative for Responsible Investment examines fundamental issues and theories underlying the ability of financial markets to promote wealth creation across asset classes, while creating a stronger society and a healthier environment. 
The Initiative for Sustainable Arts in America is a three-year effort to strengthen the nation's arts infrastructure and develop a fact-based assessment of the sustainability of urban arts institutions across the country. 
The Nonprofits in China domain focuses on the key challenges facing the growing Chinese social sector, working to leverage Harvard's resources to convene scholars and practitioners in Chinese nonprofits, and to catalyze practical solutions and academic research on subjects related to nonprofits in China. 
Women in Informal Employment: Globalizing and Organizing (WIEGO) is a global research -policy network that aims to improve the status of the working poor, especially women, in the informal economy.

The Center hosts three important blogs: Humanitarian and Development Nonprofit Organizations, Nonprofits in China and Nonprofit News & Comment.

People

Christine Letts is currently the Interim Faculty Director, having assumed the faculty leadership position following Christopher Stone, who served as Faculty Director from 2008–2012. Aviva Luz Argote serves as executive director. Other notable faculty members include Mark Moore, Marion Fremont-Smith, Marshall Ganz, Christopher Winship, Peter Dobkin Hall, Archon Fung, Herman "Dutch" Leonard, Luther Ragin, Nathalie Kylander, Alnoor Ebrahim, Jim Honan, and Bryan Hehir.

References

External links

Civil society
Non-profit organizations based in Massachusetts
Harvard University research institutes